Desmoglyptus is a genus of flower weevils in the beetle family Curculionidae. There are at least two described species in Desmoglyptus.

Species
These two species belong to the genus Desmoglyptus:
 Desmoglyptus arizonicus Casey, 1920
 Desmoglyptus crenatus (LeConte, 1876)

References

Further reading

 
 
 

Baridinae
Articles created by Qbugbot